This article will list the confirmed squad list for the 2022 Thomas & Uber Cup participating teams. The rankings used to decide the order of play are based on the BWF World Ranking per 19 April 2022.
The age listed for each player is on 8 May 2022 which is the first day of the tournament. Only a maximum of twelve players are allowed to compete in each squad.

Thomas Cup

Group A

Indonesia
12 players are scheduled to represent Indonesia in the 2022 Thomas Cup.

South Korea 
Badminton Korea Association has confirmed 9 players to represent South Korea in the 2022 Thomas Cup.

Thailand
12 players are scheduled to represent Thailand in the 2022 Thomas Cup.

Singapore

Group B

Denmark 
12 players are scheduled to represent Denmark in the 2022 Thomas Cup.

China 
12 players are scheduled to represent China in the 2022 Thomas Cup.

France 
6 players are scheduled to represent France in the 2022 Thomas Cup.

Algeria

Group C

Chinese Taipei
10 players are scheduled to represent Chinese Taipei in the 2022 Thomas Cup.

India
10 players are scheduled to represent India in the 2022 Thomas Cup.

Germany
10 players are scheduled to represent Germany in the 2022 Thomas Cup. Fabian Roth was replaced by Samuel Hsiao since he hasn't recovered from COVID-19.

Canada
8 players are scheduled to represent Canada in the 2022 Thomas Cup.

Group D

Japan
12 players are scheduled to represent Japan in the 2022 Thomas Cup.

Malaysia
12 players are scheduled to represent Malaysia in the 2022 Thomas Cup.

England 
10 players are scheduled to represent England in the 2022 Thomas Cup.

United States
5 players are scheduled to represent United States in the 2022 Thomas Cup. The team is supported by coach Dennis Christensen.

Uber Cup

Group A

Japan
12 players are scheduled to represent Japan in the 2022 Uber Cup.

Indonesia
12 players are scheduled to represent Indonesia in the 2022 Uber Cup.

France
9 players are scheduled to represent France in the 2022 Uber Cup.

Germany 
10 players are scheduled to represent Germany in the 2022 Uber Cup. Miranda Wilson was replaced by Florentine Schöffski since Wilson hasn't recovered from the injury.

Group B

China
12 players are scheduled to represent China in the 2022 Uber Cup.

Chinese Taipei
10 players are scheduled to represent Chinese Taipei in the 2022 Uber Cup.

Spain 
6 players are confirmed to represent Spain in the 2022 Uber Cup.

Australia
Australia sent their 9 Falcons to compete at the 2022 Uber Cup. The team is supported by 3 coaches (Stuart Brehaut, Jeff Tho and Leanne Choo) and a physiotherapist.

Group C

Thailand
12 players are scheduled to represent Thailand in the 2022 Uber Cup.

Denmark
10 players are scheduled to represent Denmark in the 2022 Uber Cup. Freja Ravn will not travel and participate in the tournament after suffered a cruciate ligament injury. She is replaced by Amalie Schulz.

Malaysia
12 players are scheduled to represent Malaysia in the 2022 Uber Cup.

Egypt

Group D

South Korea
12 players are scheduled to represent South Korea in the 2022 Uber Cup.

India
10 players are scheduled to represent India in the 2022 Uber Cup. Gayathri Gopichand pulled out of the tournament due to injury

Canada
9 players are scheduled to represent Canada in the 2022 Uber Cup.

United States 
8 players are scheduled to represent United States in the 2022 Uber Cup.

References

External Links
Tournament Link
Squad Lists
Draw Thomas and Uber Cup Group Stage and Knockout Stage
Schedule
Winner

 
Badminton-related lists